Gouveia may refer to:

People
 Gouveia (surname)

Places

Brazil
 Gouveia, Minas Gerais, a municipality in the State of Minas Gerais
 Delmiro Gouveia, a municipality in the State of Alagoas

Cape Verde
 Porto Gouveia, a village situated on Santiago Island

Portugal
 Gouveia, Portugal, a municipality in the district of Guarda 
 Gouveia (Sintra), a village located in the municipality of Sintra

Other
 Marquess of Gouveia, Portuguese title of nobility